The AN/FPS-4 Radar was a Height-Finder Radar used by the United States Air Force Air Defense Command.

MIT's Radiation Laboratory developed and produced the first version of this radar near the end of World War II. Zenith produced the A-model sets in the post-war period. The vertically mounted antenna was three feet wide and ten feet long. Two operators were needed to run the set. The initial model operated at a frequency of 9000 to 9160 MHz and had a maximum reliable range for bombers of 60 miles at 10,000 feet.

An updated version designated the AN/FPS-4 was produced by the Radio Corporation of America (RCA) beginning in 1948. Some 450 copies of this and the trailer-mounted AN/MPS-8 version were built between 1948 and 1955.

Technical Specs: (Radio Research catalog)
X BAND HEIGHT FINDER Radar type: AN/TPS-10D. Freq band: 9230 to 9404 mc. Pwr output and range: 250KW, 60/120 mi. Indicator: RHI. Magnetron type: 6002/QK221. Rep rate: .5 & 2 microsec 539 pps. Pwr input: 115 V 400 cy AC. Mfr: RCA.

RHI 12" CRT Range 0-60,000 ft. 200 miles. Input: 115 V 400 cy AC. Mfr: RCA type AN/TPS-10D Radar

References

 AN/TPS-10, 10A; AN/FPS-4 @ radomes.org
 Winkler, David F. (1997), Searching the skies: the legacy of the United States Cold War defense radar program. Prepared for United States Air Force Headquarters Air Combat Command.

External links

Ground radars
Radars of the United States Air Force
Military radars of the United States
AN/MPS-4
Military equipment introduced from 1945 to 1949